Ilya Vladimirovich Tkachyov (born 10 June 1982) is a former Russian professional footballer.

Club career
He made his debut for FC Shinnik Yaroslavl on 3 July 2004 in an Intertoto Cup game against FK Teplice. He also appeared for Shinnik twice in the Russian Cup.

References

1982 births
Footballers from Yaroslavl
Living people
Russian footballers
Association football defenders
FC Shinnik Yaroslavl players
FC Chita players
FC Amur Blagoveshchensk players